The 1973–74 Segunda División was the 25th season of the Mexican Segunda División. The season started on 29 July 1973 and concluded on 19 May 1974. It was won by UANL.

Changes 
 La Piedad and Nacional returned after a year on hiatus, for that reason, the league was expanded to 20 teams.
 Ciudad Madero was promoted to Primera División.
 Pachuca was relegated from Segunda División.
 Atlético Cuernavaca, Orizaba and Tecnológico de Celaya were relegated from Segunda División
 UAG, Nuevo Necaxa and U. de S.L.P. were promoted from Tercera División.
 Morelia was bought by new owners and was renamed as Atlético Morelia.

Teams

Group stage

Group A

Group 1

Results

Promotion Playoff

Final

Relegation Playoff

References 

1973–74 in Mexican football
Segunda División de México seasons